The Great Game: The Emergence of Wall Street as a World Power: 1653–2000 is a non-fiction book on business history by John Steele Gordon. The book was initially published on November 16, 1999 by Scribner.

Overview
In this book, Gordon focuses on the history of American finance industry and Wall Street, telling many interesting stories along the way such as how Chase Manhattan started off as a water company and why Merrill Lynch was named after two brokers, and not one. The book explains many concepts about how the stock market has shaped itself into one we know it today, including stories about the first corner in the Wall Street history to the most recent, the Hunt's brothers attempt to corner the silver market in 1980. Gordon also explains that every time a player misuses the market to his advantage, the invisible hand of Adam Smith pushes the system to correct itself. The book tells about prominent finance personalities, such as Jacob Little, the first great Wall Street plunger; Commodore Vanderbilt, the Street's greatest tactician; Hetty Green, the "richest woman in the world", who was terrified of being poor; J. P. Morgan, the country's most important banker, who twice saved it from economic disaster when the government could not; Richard Whitney, the president of the New York Stock Exchange, who was a thief; and Charles E. Merrill, who brought Wall Street to Main Street and transformed both in the process.

Criticism

See also
 Blue Blood and Mutiny
 The Last Tycoons

References

External links
 Business History Review
 The Great Game: The Emergence of Wall Street as a World Power 1653–2000. By John Steel Gordon. New York: Scribner, 1999. Pp. 320.

1999 non-fiction books
Books about companies
Business books